Mirza Sipihr Shikoh (Persian: میرزا سیپهر شیکوه) (13 October 1644 – 2 or 3 July 1708) also known as  Sipihr Shukoh, was a Mughal prince as the fourth son of Crown Prince Dara Shikoh and his consort Nadira Banu Begum.

Life
He was also the grandson of the fifth Mughal Emperor Shah Jahan as well as the nephew and son-in-law of the sixth Mughal Emperor Aurangzeb.

Sipihr played a role under his father in the War of Succession between the sons of Shah Jahan. During the Battle of Samugarh he, alongside Dara's general Rustam Khan Dakhini, led a cavalry charge against Aurangzeb's artillery. He also acted as Dara's ambassador in a vain attempt to persuade Maharaja Jaswant Singh of Marwar to join the cause against Aurangzeb, just prior to the Battle of Deorai on 12–14 April 1659.

On 9 June 1659, he was captured and imprisoned by Malik Jiwan, brought to Delhi and paraded through the streets in chains, then imprisoned at Gwalior Fort until 1675.
 
On 9 February 1673, he married his first cousin, Princess Zubdat-un-Nissa, who was a daughter of Aurangzeb and Dilras Banu Begum.

Death
He died in 1708, and his body was buried in Agra fort by Emperor Bahadur Shah

Ancestry

Positions
 Governor of Odisha (1680–1696)
 Qiledar of Red Fort (1701–1708)

References

1644 births
1708 deaths
Mughal princes
Indian Muslims